This is a list of British dramatists who wrote their plays in the 1950s or later.

A–G

Michael Abbensetts
Rodney Ackland
Jim Allen
Karim Alrawi
Jeffrey Archer
John Arden
Alan Ayckbourn
Enid Bagnold
John Roman Baker
Howard Barker
Peter Barnes
Mike Bartlett
Richard Bean
Alistair Beaton
Alan Bennett
Steven Berkoff
Tess Berry-Hart
Torben Betts
Alice Birch
Alan Bleasdale
Robert Bolt
Edward Bond
Leslie Bonnet
John Griffith Bowen
Howard Brenton
Jon Brittain
Moira Buffini
Gregory Burke
Margaret Busby
Leo Butler
Jez Butterworth
Glyn Cannon
Jim Cartwright

James Martin Charlton
Jimmy Chinn
Caryl Churchill
Ray Cooney
Noël Coward
Martin Crimp
Patricia Cumper
Sarah Daniels
April De Angelis
Shelagh Delaney
William Douglas-Home
Stuart Draper
Nell Dunn
David Edgar
David Eldridge
Inua Ellams
Ben Elton
Kevin Elyot

Tim Firth

Michael Frayn
Terence Frisby
Christopher Fry
Pam Gems
Juliet Gilkes Romero
John Godber
Simon Gray
Debbie tucker green
Bonnie Greer
David Greig
Trevor Griffiths
Nick Grosso

H–M

Christopher Hampton
David Hare
Zinnie Harris
Tony Harrison
Ronald Harwood
Sam Holcroft
Dusty Hughes

Stephen Jeffreys
Ann Jellicoe
Hywel John
Catherine Johnson
Terry Johnson
Sarah Kane
Barrie Keeffe
Dennis Kelly
Tom Kempinski
Hanif Kureishi
Bryony Lavery
Mike Leigh
Sue Lenier
Stephen Lowe
Clare Lizzimore

Sharman Macdonald
John McGrath
Tom McGrath
Jenny McLeod
Patrick Marber
Tony Marchant
Frank Marcus
Derek Marlowe
Mustapha Matura
David Mercer
Anthony Minghella
Adrian Mitchell
Colin Morris
John Mortimer
Tom Morton-Smith
Peter Morgan
Chloe Moss

N–Z

Bill Naughton
Anthony Neilson
Peter Nichols
William Nicholson
Joe Orton
John Osborne
Gary Owen
Paul O'Grady
Louise Page
Michael Pertwee
Caryl Phillips
Winsome Pinnock
Harold Pinter
Alan Plater
Stephen Poliakoff
Dennis Potter
David Pownall
J.B. Priestley
Peter Quilter
Terence Rattigan
Mark Ravenhill
Dan Rebellato
Lynn Redgrave
Michael Redgrave
Philip Ridley
David Rudkin
Willy Russell
James Saunders
Anthony Shaffer
Peter Shaffer
Ade Solanke
Colin Spencer
Simon Stephens
Tom Stoppard
David Storey
C. P. Taylor
Peter Terson
Ben Travers
Miles Tredinnick
Peter Ustinov
Laura Wade
Michael Wall
Timberlake Wertenbaker
Arnold Wesker
Peter Whelan
Hugh Whitemore
Nigel Williams
Roy Williams
Snoo Wilson
Charles Wood
Nicholas Wright
Benjamin Yeoh

See also 

 List of British playwrights
 List of playwrights
 List of Scottish dramatists
 Lists of writers
 Drama
 In-yer-face theatre
 Kitchen sink drama
 Theatre
 Stage play

Playwrights since 1950
Lists of dramatists and playwrights
Playwrights since 1950